Ibrahim Ramadan Ibrahim Abdelbaki (born 6 February 1988 in Fayyum, Egypt) is an Egyptian weightlifter competing in the 77 kg category. He placed fifth at the 2012 Summer Olympics with a clean and jerk of 192 kg, and a snatch of 155 kg, giving a total of 347 kg.  He finished in 9th in the same division at the 2016 Summer Olympics, with a snatch of 152 kg and a clean and jerk of 196 kg, giving a total of 338 kg.

References

External links 
  (2012 Olympics)
  (2016 Olympics)

Egyptian male weightlifters
1988 births
Living people
Weightlifters at the 2012 Summer Olympics
Weightlifters at the 2016 Summer Olympics
Olympic weightlifters of Egypt
African Games silver medalists for Egypt
African Games medalists in weightlifting
People from Faiyum
Mediterranean Games gold medalists for Egypt
Mediterranean Games medalists in weightlifting
Competitors at the 2007 All-Africa Games
Competitors at the 2009 Mediterranean Games
Competitors at the 2013 Mediterranean Games
20th-century Egyptian people
21st-century Egyptian people